Mormyrus caschive, the eastern bottlenose or elephant snout, is a species of ray-finned fish in the family Mormyridae. It is found in the Nile basin, including both the main river and some of its tributaries and lakes, in Egypt, Ethiopia, South Sudan, Sudan and Uganda.

References

Mormyrus
Fish of Uganda
Taxonomy articles created by Polbot
Fish described in 1758
Taxa named by Carl Linnaeus